The "Why Mom Deserves a Diamond" contest is an American essay contest founded by Michael "Diamond Mike" Watson in Costa Mesa, California in 1993. The contest was established in honor of Watson's adoptive mother and the birth mother he had never known. In a limited number of words, children are asked to write essays explaining why their mother deserves a diamond.

Hundreds of thousands of American children have participated, and dozens of children have won the grand prize of a diamond to give to their mothers (and other precious gems). The first winner was sophomore Margaret Ketchersid, from Edison High School in Huntington Beach, California. On Mother's Day 1993, she was awarded the grand prize of a quarter-carat diamond to give to her mother, Ruth.

Founder 

Michael "Diamond Mike" Watson was born and adopted in Indianapolis in 1958. He spent his early life in New Albany, where his adopted parents raised him. The foundation of the contest began while Watson was searching for his own birth mother when he was 17.

About the same time he started his quest, Watson entered the jewelry industry as an errand boy for a store in New Albany. He joined a retail chain and worked in jewelry stores in Indiana, Kentucky and Kansas City, then moved to California in 1989.
In 1991, Watson opened Gallery of Diamonds Jewelers in Costa Mesa, California.

Watson obtained a copy of his hospital bill from Community Hospital, which showed his mother's name (Betty Price) and age. Armed with this information, he embarked on a search that lasted nearly 20 years. Watson found the judge who had presided over the adoption only to learn that the records were sealed. The judge did, however, give Watson the report by the Department of Public Welfare, which contained information about his birth mother. The report listed names and a wedding date, and he contacted every county in Indiana to locate a wedding license. In mid-1994 he heard from the courthouse in Coatesville that the information on the license matched. He found that his birth mother's maiden name was Stewart, and also discovered her parents' address and telephone number. When calling his biological grandmother, she said that no one knew he was alive because his birth mother told the family he was stillborn. He learned that his mother had died in 1981.

Watson then learned he had an infant sister that vanished before he was born.  Thus began a new journey to find his missing sibling. With the help of five genealogical researchers in which Watson named the Fabulous Five, Watson finally found his missing sister alive and well in 2017.   That same year, with the miracle of DNA matching, Watson discovered his paternal Syrian Jewish roots and that he came from a long ancestry of distinguished rabbis from Aleppo, Syria.   His great great grandfather was Hakham Mordechai Abadi.

From 1993 to 2012, Watson published the winning entries in an annual book to raise money for the local county's library. Over the years, thousands of children submit their essays to the company's headquarters in Santa Ana, California, and come to Gallery of Diamonds Jewelers every year.

Watson earned a Bachelor of Science in Business Administration from Indiana University Southeast and is a gemologist from the Gemological Institute of America. He is the author of Moon Over Mountains- The Search for Mom, The Legend of Why Mom Deserves a Diamond, Tales of Imagination- Everything is Real, In Search of Mom- Journey of an Adoptee, and Adopted Like Me- Chosen to Search for a Birthmother.

Intellectual property 

The trademark Why Mom Deserves a Diamond was filed with the United States Patent and Trademark office on July 27, 2001, registration number 2,620,840. The trademark, The Legendary Contest, received registration on April 17, 2007, as "A writing contest in which kids can honor their mothers and have the chance to win a diamond or gemstone." Reg #3229618.

Franchise 

In 2009, the Why Mom Deserves a Diamond contest became incorporated, and in 2010 it became a franchise with the mission of "giving every child the opportunity to express their words of appreciation to the mothers."

Anthologies 

From 1993 to 2012, Gallery of Diamonds Jewelers, the founding sponsor of the contest, published an annual anthology of the winners. A portion of the proceeds from the sale of these books were donated to the Orange County Library system in Orange County, California. Following are the book titles and the years they were published. 
 2012. Why Mom Deserves a Diamond - A Gift of Love
 2011. Why Mom Deserves a Diamond - Legacy Edition
 2010. Why Mom Deserves a Diamond - Discovered With Great Bliss
 2009. Why Mom Deserves a Diamond - The Encouraging Branch
 2008. Why Mom Deserves a Diamond - The Crystal Heart
 2007. Why Mom Deserves a Diamond - Sparkling Treasures
 2006. Why Mom Deserves a Diamond - Beyond the Goddess Venus
 2005. Why Mom Deserves a Diamond - Words of Love
 2004. Why Mom Deserves a Diamond - Twelve Years of Love
 2003. Why Mom Deserves a Diamond - The Legendary Contest
 2002. Why Mom Deserves a Diamond - 10th Anniversary of the Greatest Contest on Earth
 2001. Why Mom Deserves a Diamond - The Greatest Contest on Earth
 2000. Why Mom Deserves a Diamond - A Millennium Mother's Day Tribute
 1999. Why Mom Deserves a Diamond - Seventh Anniversary Edition
 1998. Why Mom Deserves a Diamond - 1,500 Essay Winners for 1998
 1997. Why Mom Deserves a Diamond - 1,002 Essay Winners for 1997
 1996. Why Mom Deserves a Diamond - 732 Essay Winners for 1996
 1995. Why Mom Deserves a Diamond - 391 Essay Winners for 1995
 1994. Why Mom Deserves a Diamond - 1994 Essay Winners
 1993. Why Mom Deserves a Diamond - 1993 Essay Winners

References

External links 
 
 CBS News

Writing contests
Recurring events established in 1993
1993 establishments in California